KLTN (102.9 FM "Que Buena 102.9") is a Regional Mexican radio station broadcasting in Houston, Texas, United States.  Owned by Univision Radio, its studios are in Uptown Houston and the transmitter is located on the historic (1948) KNUZ tower, along with sister station KAMA-FM, at 315 N. Ennis Street in the East End.

History

Allocation Beginnings as KPRC-FM, KHGM
102.9 originally signed on the air as KPRC-FM at 3 pm, December 24, 1946, when the station moved from the 99.7 frequency. Calls changed to KHGM (meaning "Home of Good Music) in November 1958. By April 1959 the station had moved again, back to the middle of the FM dial at 99.1 MHz, where it is now known as KODA.

KQUE 103
Broadcasting returned to 102.9 FM when KQUE signed on the air with an adult standards format on October 1, 1960, co-owned by Dave Morris who also owned 1230 AM, KNUZ.

The station had a ERP of 280,000 watts, making KQUE a "superpower FM" (running more than the 100KW ERP now allowed for top end FM stations) but was lowered to normal power after the tower was extended in the 1970s, was also known as "KQUE 103" until 1997, when the station was purchased from its local owner, Dave Morris, by Robert F. X. Sillerman and his company, SFX Broadcasting.

The Planet
At 4 p.m. on March 19, 1997, the KQUE callsign and standards format were moved to 1230 AM, with 102.9 then flipping to KKPN, a Modern AC format known as "The Planet", under Steve Hick's Capstar Broadcasting ownership (the first song on "The Planet" was "You Oughta Know" by Alanis Morissette). After a series of mergers, the station came under the ownership of Clear Channel Communications. Clear Channel was forced to spin off several stations in the Houston area to meet Federal Communications Commission ownership restrictions.

Estereo Latino
KKPN, at that time, had the smallest overall coverage area of all the stations in the Clear Channel cluster (due to its 1000-foot tower location east of downtown Houston) and it could not move to the 2000 foot Missouri City antenna farm.

It was then sold to Heftel Communications, a company specializing in Spanish language broadcasting. Heftel changed the station to its current format, moved from the two rimshot facilities 93.3 KLTN and 104.9 KLTO, on March 29, 1998. The station was assigned the current KLTN call letters on June 25, 1998 after being moved from 93.3. Heftel merged with Tichenor Media to create Hispanic Broadcasting, which later became Univision Radio, the station's current owner.

Que Buena
After nearly 20 years as either "Estereo Latino" or simply the dial position of "102.9", KLTN has been renamed "Que Buena 102.9" as of April 6, 2018, taking the name formerly used by its sister station KQBU-FM, which itself dropped the brand and format recently to simulcast its other sister KAMA-FM "Latino Mix 104.9". It has not been verified whether or not KLTN will swap calls with KQBU-FM to go with the newly christened 102.9 facility, as KLTN would also fit the newly formatted 93.3 facility, given the current name LaTiNo Mix.

Former callsigns
KPRC – 10/1947 (Sign on, station moved from 99.7)
KHGM – September 11, 1958 (moved to 99.1 on April 26, 1959)
KQUE – January 10, 1960
KKPN – May 23, 1997
KLTN – June 25, 1998

References

External links
Que Buena Website

Mexican-American culture in Houston
LTN
Regional Mexican radio stations in the United States
LTN
Harris County, Texas
Univision Radio Network stations
Radio stations established in 1947
1947 establishments in Texas